Luís Gil Bettencourt (born June 26, 1956) is a Portuguese-American musician, songwriter, and music producer.

Early life
Luís Gil Mendes Bettencourt was born in 1956 in the town of Praia da Vitória, on Terceira Island of the Azores. He is one of ten children of Ezequiel Mendes Bettencourt and Aureolina da Cunha Gil de Ávila, who were both from musical backgrounds, Ezequiel being a professor of music. His younger brother is musician Nuno Bettencourt.

Musical career
As a youth, Bettencourt was known as "Luisinho da Praia da Vitória" and performed on stages across the Azorean islands.

In 1971 the family emigrated to Hudson, Massachusetts where Ezequiel opened a music shop. Bettencourt had planned to attend law school but was not successful in obtaining a scholarship, and so he focused on music. With brothers Roberto and Nuno, he formed a progressive rock band called Alien (later called Viking). Nuno had originally been the drummer, but Luís taught him to play the guitar.

Bettencourt returned to Portugal in 1984, and in 1985 released his first solo album, Empty Space, collaborating with the Gulbenkian Orchestra. Later in the decade he composed soundtracks for RTP Açores programmes and served as a musical director alongside José "Zeca" Medeiros.

In 1989 Bettencourt moved back to Terceira Island, where he produced a TV film Vivências ("Experiences") and formed the traditional music group Cantinho da Terceira.

He was involved in the creation of events such as the Azores cultural show at Expo '98 in Lisbon, creating for this purpose the Lira Açoriana regional orchestra to train young brass musicians in the islands.

In 2013 he retired from solo touring for health reasons, but is involved in the musical career of his daughter, Maria.

Discography

Studio
Empty Space (1985)
"If There's a Reason" / "In-Out" (single)
"Tema d'Amor" (single)
Bilingual (album)
Antero (album)
Viola de Dois Corações... A Minha Viola (EP) (2017)

As producer 
Açores, Um Convite (1985), Victor Cruz
Monte Formoso (1989), Brigada Víctor Jara
A Primeira Vez (1992), Grupo de Violas da Ilha Terceira
Azul (1997), Carlos Medeiros
O Cantar Na M'Incomoda (1998), Carlos Medeiros
Dança das Fitas (2000), Carlos Medeiros
Susana Coelho & Trio (2000), Susana Coelho & Trio

References

Portuguese singer-songwriters
Portuguese guitarists
Male guitarists
1956 births
People from Praia da Vitória
People from Hudson, Massachusetts
Living people